Benefit plan may refer to:

Employee benefits
Pension plan